This article is a list of the counts of Mâcon.  In medieval France, the county of Mâcon was a county centred on the town called Mâcon in the southern half of medieval Burgundy, in what is now Saône-et-Loire (Mâconnais).

Carolingian counts
fl. 834–845: Guerin of Provence
869–883: Theodoric († 883), son of Guerin
???-877: Ecchard of Mâcon († 877), (Carolingian Nibelungids family)
877–887: Boso of Provence († 887), (family of the Bosonid counts of Provence)
884–886: Bernard Plantevelue († 886), (family of the comtes d'Auvergne)
886–918: William I of Aquitaine, known as the Pious († 918), son of the former, count of Auvergne and duke of Aquitaine
918–926: William II of Aquitaine († 926), nephew of the former, count of Auvergne and duke of Aquitaine
926–928: Acfred of Aquitaine († 928), brother of the former, count of Auvergne and duke of Aquitaine
The counts of Auvergne installed the viscounts at Mâcon. The centre of power of the dukes of Aquitaine, then the struggles for control of Aquitaine on Acfred's death, made the viscounts take a comtal title.
884-???: Liétald, viscount of Mâcon
???-915: Ranoux, viscount of Mâcon, probably a close relation of the former
915-943: Aubry I of Mâcon († 943), viscount of Narbonne, entitled comte de Mâcon in 932, married Atallana, daughter of Racon
943–966: Liétald II of Mâcon († 966), son of the former, married Ermengearde, sister of Gilbert of Chalon, comte principal of Burgundy
966–982: Aubry II of Mâcon († 982), son of the former, married Ermentrude of Roucy

Comtal house of Burgundy
982–1002: Otto-William of Burgundy (958 † 1026) count of Burgundy, son of Adalbert of Italy and of  Gerberge of Chalon
1002–1004: Guy I of Mâcon († 1004), count of Mâcon, son of the former
1004–1049: Otto II of Mâcon († 1049), count of Mâcon, son of the former:married Elisabeth of Vergy
1049–1065: Geoffroy of Mâcon († 1065), count of Mâcon, son of the former:married Béatrice
1065–1078: Guy II of Mâcon († 1109), count of Mâcon, son of the former. In 1078, he became a monk at Cluny Abbey and ceded Macon to his cousin William I of Burgundy
1078–1085: William I of Burgundy († 1087), count of Burgundy and of Macon, cousin of the former, son of Renaud I of Burgundy and of Alice of Normandy, grandson of Otto-William

1157–1184: Géraud I of Mâcon (1142 † 1184), count of Mâcon and of Vienne, son of William III of Mâcon, married Maurette de Salins
1184–1224: William IV of Mâcon († 1224), count of Mâcon, of Auxonne and of Vienne, eldest son of the former, married Poncia of Beaujeu, then married Scholastique, daughter of Henry I of Champagne
1224–1224: Géraud II of Mâcon († 1224), count of Mâcon and of Vienne, son of the former and of Scolastique de Champagne, married Alix Guigonne, daughter of Guigues III of Forez
1224–1239: Alix of Mâcon († 1260), countess of Mâcon and of Vienne, daughter of the former, married John of Dreux († 1239)
1239 on the death of her husband, countess Alix of Mâcon sold the counties of Vienne and Mâcon to the crown of France.

History of Burgundy
Medieval France
Macon